Richard Dudley Hubbard (September 7, 1818 – February 28, 1884) was a United States representative and the 48th Governor of Connecticut.

Biography
Born in Berlin, Connecticut, he was orphaned while young, he pursued preparatory studies at East Hartford and graduated from Yale College in 1839, where he was a member of Skull and Bones.  He studied law, was admitted to the bar in 1842 and commenced practice in Hartford. He married Mary Juliana Morgan and they had six children.

Career
Hubbard was a member of the Connecticut House of Representatives in 1842, 1855, and again in 1858, and was prosecuting attorney for Hartford County from 1846 to 1868. A lifelong Democrat, he nevertheless supported the Federal government throughout the Civil War.

Hubbard was elected as a Democrat to the Fortieth Congress, holding office from March 4, 1867 to March 3, 1869.  He declined to be a candidate for renomination in 1868 and resumed the practice of law in Hartford. He was the nominee for governor in the 1872 election, but lost to Marshall Jewell.

He was a delegate to Democratic National Convention from Connecticut, 1876 and a member of the Resolutions Committee.

In November 1876 Hubbard was elected Governor of Connecticut, the first to be elected to a two-year term. He successfully advocated for legislation that altered the property rights of women, "making husband and wife equal in property rights." Also, a bill was constituted that formed the State Board of Health; a commission was formed that managed Connecticut's dams and reservoirs, and regulations were amended that benefited the insurance industry. In January 1878, Hubbard served on the committee that established the American Bar Association. He was an unsuccessful candidate for reelection as governor in 1878. He engaged in the practice of law from 1877 until his death in Hartford.

Death and legacy
Hubbard died of Bright's disease on February 28, 1884. He is interred at Cedar Hill Cemetery.

A statue of Hubbard is on the east lawn of the Connecticut State Capitol building in Hartford Connecticut with a plaque that describes him as "Lawyer, Orator, Statesman."

References

External links

 Dwight Loomis and J. Gilbert Calhoun, The Judicial and Civil History of Connecticut (Boston: Boston History Company, 1895)
 Frederick Calvin Norton, The Governors of Connecticut (New Haven, CT: Connecticut Magazine Company, 1905), available online
 Robert Sobel and John Raimo, Biographical Directory of the Governors of the United States, 1789–1978. Greenwood Press, 1988, 
The Political Graveyard
Govtrack US Congress
National Governors Association

1818 births
1884 deaths
19th-century American politicians
Burials at Cedar Hill Cemetery (Hartford, Connecticut)
Connecticut lawyers
Deaths from nephritis
Democratic Party members of the United States House of Representatives from Connecticut
Democratic Party governors of Connecticut
Founding members of the American Bar Association
Democratic Party members of the Connecticut House of Representatives
People from Berlin, Connecticut
Yale College alumni
19th-century American lawyers